Christiane Seidel (born April 3, 1988) is a German-Danish-American actress, having had roles in Boardwalk Empire (2011-2014), Schmidts Katze (2014), The Hollow (2016), Godless (2017), Fosse/Verdon and Human Capital (2019), and Paradise Highway in 2022.

Early life
Seidel was born in Wichita Falls, Texas, to a Danish mother and a German father, who was serving in the navy. She also grew up in Denmark and Germany. Her first experience of acting came in a school nativity play. She followed her interest in acting by attending theatre camps, performing The Rocky Horror Picture Show in German, and attended for a semester at film school in Cape Town, South Africa. Seidel studied Media Management in Europe, before returning to the US to study at the Lee Strasberg Theatre and Film Institute in New York, to pursue her acting career.

Career
Seidel's US television debut was as a Guest Star on NBC Universal's police drama Law & Order: Special Victims Unit'''s  season 12 premiere episode in 2010.  She starred as FBI Agent Sarah DeSoto in the noir-feature film, The Hollow in 2015, and as Sybille Ranisch in Schmidts Katze in 2014,.

Seidel starred as Sigrid Mueller, the Norwegian wife to rogue Treasury Agent Nelson Van Alden (Michael Shannon) in the HBO TV drama series Boardwalk Empire from season 2 to season 5 (2012 – 2015). As of 2015, Seidel is a member of the Scandinavian American Theater Company, a theater company which has introduced several Scandinavian plays to the United States. In 2017, Seidel played Martha, a mysterious, free-spirited German stranger, in the Netflix mini-series Godless, starring alongside Michelle Dockery and Jeff Daniels.

In 2019, Seidel played the role of Hannah, mistress of Bob Fosse (Sam Rockwell) in FX television series Fosse/Verdon.

In 2020, she played Helen Deardorff in the Scott Frank directed The Queen's Gambit alongside Anya Taylor-Joy.

In 2022, Seidel stars in the Anna Gutto directed thriller movie Paradise Highway, in a cast which included Juliette Binoche and Morgan Freeman.

Personal life
Seidel was pregnant during the filming of Godless'' in 2017 and is mother of twin boys.

Filmography

Television

Awards and nominations

References

External links

Living people
21st-century American actresses
Actresses from Texas
Danish television actresses
German television actresses
Lee Strasberg Theatre and Film Institute alumni
People from Wichita Falls, Texas
German people of Danish descent
Danish people of German descent
1988 births